This is a list of vice-chancellors of the University of Hong Kong.

References

 

Vice-Chancellors of the University of Hong Kong
hong kong